Formica propinqua is a species of ant in the family Formicidae.

References

Further reading

 

propinqua
Articles created by Qbugbot
Insects described in 1940